Cassa di Risparmio di Vignola was an Italian saving bank based in Vignola, in the Province of Modena, Emilia–Romagna region. It was absorbed by Banca Popolare dell'Emilia Romagna in 2010.

History
Cassa di Risparmio di Vignola (the saving bank of Vignola) was founded on 4 August 1872. Soon after it merged with Cassa di Risparmio di Spilamberto. Due to Legge Amato, the bank was split into Banca CRV – Cassa di Risparmio di Vignola S.p.A. (a limited company) and Fondazione Cassa di Risparmio di Vignola (a banking foundation; now known as Fondazione di Vignola) on 20 December 1991 (gazetted on 24 January 1992).

The foundation sold the majority interests in the company, to Banca Popolare dell'Emilia Romagna (BPER) in late 1990s. In 2000, BPER owned 76.087% shares. The remain 23.913% shares was sold by the foundation to BPER in 2005, for about €33 million.

On 29 November 2010 the bank was absorbed into the parent company.

Banking foundation
The former owner of the bank, Fondazione di Vignola, still runs as a charity organization.

See also
 Cassa di Risparmio di Modena, a predecessor of UniCredit
 Cassa di Risparmio di Carpi, a defunct subsidiary of UniCredit from the Province of Modena
 Cassa di Risparmio di Mirandola, a defunct subsidiary of Intesa Sanpaolo from the Province of Modena

References

External links
 Official website of Fondazione di Vignola 

Defunct banks of Italy
BPER Banca
Companies based in the Province of Modena
Vignola
Banks established in 1872
Banks disestablished in 2010
Italian companies established in 1872
Italian companies disestablished in 2010